Anjireh (also Romanized as Ānjīreh; also known as Ānjīrsiyah) is a village in Saroleh Rural District, Meydavud District, Bagh-e Malek County, Khuzestan Province, Iran. At the 2006 census, its population was 36, in 8 families.

References 

Populated places in Bagh-e Malek County